Birthday is the third studio LP album by The Peddlers, originally released in 1969. It was their final recording for the label before the group returned to Philips.

Track listing

Personnel
 Roy Phillips – acoustic guitar, organ, piano, vocals
 Trevor Morais – percussion
 Tab Martin – electric bass
 Mike Claydon – engineer
 Cyril Smith – producer
 Ted Sharp – engineer
 Andy Johns – engineer
 Terence Donovan – cover artwork
 Chris Hopper – inner artwork
 John Hays – design

References

1969 albums